The John Janecek House, also known as the Jerry Janáček House, is an historic home located in Schuyler, Nebraska that was built in 1885–1886. It was listed on the National Register of Historic Places on July 15, 1982. The house was owned by John Janecek, a Czech American who immigrated to Nebraska from Bohemia in 1870.  He was the owner and the proprietor of the Janecek Opera House (razed in 1963) in Schuyler.

It was designed by Omaha architect Henry Voss. The NRHP listing included an entire city block,  in area.

References

External links

 

Houses in Colfax County, Nebraska
Czech-American culture in Nebraska
Houses completed in 1886
Houses on the National Register of Historic Places in Nebraska
Queen Anne architecture in Nebraska
National Register of Historic Places in Colfax County, Nebraska